Julian Keith Strickland (born October 26, 1953) is an American singer-songwriter, composer, musician, multi-instrumentalist, and one of the founding members of The B-52s. He was born in Athens, Georgia.

Originally the band's drummer, Strickland switched to guitar after the death of guitarist Ricky Wilson in 1985. Strickland also plays keyboards and bass guitar on many of The B-52s recordings, and has occasionally provided backing vocals. Strickland composes the music for The B-52s. He said of the process: "Ricky and I used to write the music together, but now I write the individual instrument parts and arrange the instrumental compositions myself. I'm trying to convey a feeling when I compose. I think of my instrumentals as soundscapes – the chord progressions, rhythms, harmonics and musical direction are used to evoke various sonic atmospheres or moods."

Strickland came out as gay in 1992.

On December 13, 2012, Strickland retired from touring for the B-52s. Fred Schneider said of Strickland's announcement, "We had known about Keith’s decision for a while but we just didn’t want to think about it. Keith will probably still be available for special shows but he wanted to get off the road. Keith will always be able to work with us whenever he wants. He's a best friend." Greg Suran is his current live stand-in.

Filmography
 A Life in the Death of Joe Meek (2000)
 The Flintstones (1994)
 Athens, GA: Inside Out (1987)
 One Trick Pony (1980)

References

External links
 

1953 births
Living people
Musicians from Athens, Georgia
American rock drummers
American rock guitarists
American male guitarists
The B-52's members
American gay musicians
American new wave musicians
Guitarists from Georgia (U.S. state)
LGBT people from Georgia (U.S. state)
20th-century American drummers
American male drummers
20th-century American guitarists
20th-century American LGBT people
21st-century American LGBT people